The University of Wisconsin–Madison (University of Wisconsin, Wisconsin, UW, UW–Madison, or simply Madison) is a public land-grant research university in Madison, Wisconsin. Founded when Wisconsin achieved statehood in 1848, UW–Madison is the official state university of Wisconsin and the flagship campus of the University of Wisconsin System. It was the first public university established in Wisconsin and remains the oldest and largest public university in the state. It became a land-grant institution in 1866. The  main campus, located on the shores of Lake Mendota, includes four National Historic Landmarks.

UW–Madison is organized into 20 schools and colleges, which enrolled 33,506 undergraduate, 9,772 graduate, 1,968 special, and 2,686 professional students in 2021. Its academic programs include 136 undergraduate majors, 148 master's degree programs, and 120 doctoral programs. A major contributor to Wisconsin's economy, the university is the largest employer in the state, with over 24,232 faculty and staff.

Wisconsin is one of the twelve founding members of the Association of American Universities, a selective group of major research universities in North America. It is considered a Public Ivy, and is classified as an R1 University, meaning that it engages in a very high level of research activity. Additionally, as of November 2018, the current CEOs of 14 Fortune 500 companies have attended UW–Madison, the most of any university in the United States.

Among the scientific advances made at UW–Madison are the single-grain experiment, the discovery of vitamins A and B by Elmer McCollum and Marguerite Davis, the development of the anticoagulant medication warfarin by Karl Paul Link, the first chemical synthesis of a gene by Har Gobind Khorana, the discovery of the retroviral enzyme reverse transcriptase by Howard Temin, and the first synthesis of human embryonic stem cells  by James Thomson. UW–Madison was also the home of both the prominent "Wisconsin School" of economics and of diplomatic history. UW–Madison professor Aldo Leopold played an important role in the development of modern environmental science and conservationism, while UW–Madison professor Gloria Ladson-Billings formulated the framework of culturally relevant pedagogy.

The Wisconsin Badgers compete in 25 intercollegiate sports in the NCAA Division I Big Ten Conference and have won 31 national championships. Wisconsin students and alumni have won 50 Olympic medals (including 13 gold medals).

History

The university had its official beginnings when the Wisconsin Territorial Legislature in its 1838 session passed a law incorporating a "University of the Territory of Wisconsin", and a high-ranking Board of Visitors was appointed. However, this body (the predecessor of the U.W. board of regents) never actually accomplished anything before Wisconsin was incorporated as a state in 1848. The Wisconsin Constitution provided for "the establishment of a state university, at or near the seat of state government..." and directed by the state legislature to be governed by a board of regents and administered by a Chancellor. On July 26, 1848, Nelson Dewey, Wisconsin's first governor, signed the act that formally created the University of Wisconsin. John H. Lathrop became the university's first chancellor, in the fall of 1849. With John W. Sterling as the university's first professor (mathematics), the first class of 17 students met at Madison Female Academy on February 5, 1849. A permanent campus site was soon selected: an area of  "bounded north by Fourth lake, east by a street to be opened at right angles with King street", [later State Street] "south by Mineral Point Road (University Avenue), and west by a carriage-way from said road to the lake." The regents' building plans called for a "main edifice fronting towards the Capitol, three stories high, surmounted by an observatory for astronomical observations." This building, University Hall, now known as Bascom Hall, was finally completed in 1859. On October 10, 1916, a fire destroyed the building's dome, which was never replaced. North Hall, constructed in 1851, was actually the first building on campus. In 1854, Levi Booth and Charles T. Wakeley became the first graduates of the university, and in 1892 the university awarded its first PhD to future university president Charles R. Van Hise.

The Wisconsin Idea
Research, teaching, and service at the UW is influenced by a tradition known as "the Wisconsin Idea", first articulated by UW–Madison President Charles Van Hise in 1904, when he declared "I shall never be content until the beneficent influence of the University reaches every home in the state." The Wisconsin Idea holds that the boundaries of the university should be the boundaries of the state, and that the research conducted at UW–Madison should be applied to solve problems and improve health, quality of life, the environment, and agriculture for all citizens of the state. The Wisconsin Idea permeates the university's work and helps forge close working relationships among university faculty and students, and the state's industries and government. Based in Wisconsin's populist history, the Wisconsin Idea continues to inspire the work of the faculty, staff, and students who aim to solve real-world problems by working together across disciplines and demographics.

World War II
During World War II, University of Wisconsin was one of 131 colleges and universities nationally that took part in the V-12 Navy College Training Program which offered students a path to a Navy commission.

Expansion

Over time, additional campuses were added to the university. The University of Wisconsin–Milwaukee was created in 1956, and UW–Green Bay and UW–Parkside in 1968. Ten freshman-sophomore centers were also added to this system. In 1971, Wisconsin legislators passed a law merging the University of Wisconsin with the nine universities and four freshman-sophomore branch campuses of the Wisconsin State Universities System, creating the University of Wisconsin System and bringing the two higher education systems under a single board of regents.

Student activism

In the late 1960s and early 1970s, UW–Madison was shaken by a series of student protests, and by the use of force by authorities in response, comprehensively documented in the film The War at Home. The first major demonstrations protested the presence on campus of recruiters for the Dow Chemical Company, which supplied the napalm used in the Vietnam War. Authorities used force to quell the disturbance. The struggle was documented in the book, They Marched into Sunlight, as well as the PBS documentary Two Days in October. Among the students injured in the protest was former Madison mayor Paul Soglin.

Another target of protest was the Army Mathematics Research Center (AMRC) in Sterling Hall, which was also home of the physics department. The student newspaper, The Daily Cardinal, published a series of investigative articles stating that AMRC was pursuing research directly pursuant to US Department of Defense requests, and supportive of military operations in Vietnam. AMRC became a magnet for demonstrations, in which protesters chanted "U.S. out of Vietnam! Smash Army Math!"

On August 24, 1970, near 3:40 am, a bomb exploded next to Sterling Hall, aimed at destroying the Army Math Research Center. Despite the late hour, a post doctoral physics researcher, Robert Fassnacht, was in the lab and was killed in the explosion. The physics department was severely damaged, while the intended target, the AMRC, was scarcely affected. Karleton Armstrong, Dwight Armstrong, and David Fine were found responsible for the blast. Leo Burt was identified as a suspect, but was never apprehended or tried.

Timeline of notable events

Notable moments in the history of the University of Wisconsin–Madison include:
 1848 on July 26, act creating the university signed by the governor
 1849 on February 5, the first class meets 
 1863 Female students first admitted to University of Wisconsin during the American Civil War
 1866 State legislature designated the university as the Wisconsin land-grant institution
 1875  William Smith Noland is the first known African-American to graduate from the university.
 1888 Science Hall is constructed, one of the world's first buildings to use I-beams
 1892 on April 4,  the first edition of the student-run The Daily Cardinal was published
 1894 State Board of Regents rejected an effort to purge Professor Richard T. Ely for supporting striking printers, issuing the famous "sifting and winnowing" manifesto in defense of academic freedom, later described as "part of Wisconsin's Magna Carta"
 1904–1905 UW Graduate School established
 1905 the university awards the first PhD in chemical engineering ever granted, to Oliver Patterson Watts.
 1907 Wisconsin Union was founded
 1909 William Purdy and Paul Beck wrote On, Wisconsin the UW–Madison athletic fight song
 1907–1911 The "Single-grain experiment" was conducted by Stephen Moulton Babcock and Edwin B. Hart, paving the way for modern nutrition as a science
 1913 Vitamin A discovered by Elmer V. McCollum and Marguerite Davis
 1916 Vitamin B discovered by McCollum and Davis
 1919 Radio station 9XM founded on campus (now WHA (970 AM), it is the oldest continually operating radio station in the United States)
 1923 Harry Steenbock invented process for adding vitamin D to milk
 1925 Wisconsin Alumni Research Foundation chartered to control patenting and patent income on UW–Madison inventions
 1934 The University of Wisconsin–Madison Arboretum, whose mission was to restore lost landscapes, such as prairies, was opened
 1936 UW–Madison began an artist-in-residence program, the first ever at a university, with John Steuart Curry
 1940–1951 Warfarin (Coumadin) developed at UW. Named after Wisconsin Alumni Research Foundation
 1969 The Badger Herald was founded as a conservative student paper
 1969 UW–Madison's Howard Temin (Virologist) co-discovers the enzyme reverse transcriptase
 1970 Sterling Hall bombing
 1984 University Research Park founded to encourage technology transfer between university and businesses
 1998 UW–Madison's James Thomson first isolated and cultured human embryonic stem cells
 2020 In response to an ongoing pandemic of coronavirus disease 2019 and amidst a statewide public health emergency declaration, UW–Madison suspends in-person instruction from March 23 until at least the end of the summer term, shifting courses online and drastically reducing campus operations.

Admissions

Undergraduate 

The 2022 annual ranking of U.S. News & World Report categorizes UW-Madison as "more selective". For the Class of 2026 (enrolled fall 2022), UW-Madison received 60,260 applications and accepted 29,546 (49.0%). Of those accepted, 8,635 enrolled, a yield rate (the percentage of accepted students who choose to attend the university) of 29.2%. UW-Madison's freshman retention rate is 94.2%, with 89.2% going on to graduate within six years.

The university started test-optional admissions with the Fall 2021 incoming class in response to the COVID-19 pandemic and has extended this through Fall 2024. Of the 38% of enrolled freshmen in 2022 who submitted ACT scores; the middle 50 percent Composite score was between 28 and 33. Of the 18% of the incoming freshman class who submitted SAT scores; the middle 50 percent Composite scores were 1370-1500. 

The University of Wisconsin–Madison is a college-sponsor of the National Merit Scholarship Program and sponsored 10 Merit Scholarship awards in 2020. In the 2020–2021 academic year, 30 freshman students were National Merit Scholars.

Academics

The University of Wisconsin–Madison, the flagship campus of the University of Wisconsin System, is a large, four-year research university comprising twenty associated colleges and schools. In addition to undergraduate and graduate divisions in agriculture and life sciences, business, education, engineering, human ecology, journalism and mass communication, letters and science, music, nursing, pharmacy, and social welfare, the university also maintains graduate and professional schools in environmental studies, law, library and information studies, medicine and public health (School of Medicine and Public Health), public affairs, and veterinary medicine.

The four year, full-time undergraduate instructional program is classified by the Carnegie Foundation for the Advancement of Teaching as "arts and science plus professions" with a high graduate coexistence. The largest university college, the College of Letters and Science, enrolls approximately half of the undergraduate student body and is made up of 38 departments and five professional schools that instruct students and carry out research in a wide variety of fields, such as astronomy, economics, geography, history, linguistics, and zoology. The graduate instructional program is classified by Carnegie as "comprehensive with medical/veterinary." In 2008, it granted the third largest number of doctorates in the nation.

Rankings

International
In the 2021 QS World University Rankings, UW-Madison was ranked 65th in the world. The 2021 Times Higher Education World University Rankings placed UW-Madison 58th worldwide, based primarily on surveys administered to students, faculty, and recruiters.  For 2021, UW-Madison was ranked tied for 41st by U.S. News & World Report among global universities. UW-Madison was ranked 31st among world universities in 2021 by the Academic Ranking of World Universities, which assesses academic and research performance.

National
UW-Madison's undergraduate program was ranked tied for 38th among national universities by U.S. News & World Report for 2022 and tied for 10th among public colleges and universities. The same publication ranked UW's graduate Wisconsin School of Business tied for 42nd. Other graduate schools ranked by USNWR for 2022 include the School of Medicine and Public Health, which was 33rd in research and 12th in primary care, the University of Wisconsin–Madison School of Education tied for fourth, the University of Wisconsin–Madison College of Engineering tied for 26th, the University of Wisconsin Law School tied for 29th, and the Robert M. La Follette School of Public Affairs tied for 25th.

The Wall Street Journal/Times Higher Education College Rankings 2021 ranked UW-Madison 65th among 801 U.S. colleges and universities based upon 15 individual performance indicators. UW-Madison was ranked fourth in the nation by the Washington Monthly 2021 National University Rankings.

In 2022, Money.com positioned the University of Wisconsin-Madison 17th out of 600 four-year colleges universities in their Best Colleges in America list.

Research

UW–Madison was a founding member of the Association of American Universities. In fiscal year 2018 the school received $1.206 billion in research and development (R&D) funding, placing it eighth in the U.S. among institutions of higher education. Its research programs were fourth in the number of patents issued in 2010.

The University of Wisconsin–Madison is one of 33 sea grant colleges in the United States. These colleges are involved in scientific research, education, training, and extension projects geared toward the conservation and practical use of U.S. coasts, the Great Lakes and other marine areas.

The university maintains almost 100 research centers and programs, ranging from agriculture to arts, from education to engineering. It has been considered a major academic center for embryonic stem cell research ever since UW–Madison professor James Thomson became the first scientist to isolate human embryonic stem cells. This has brought significant attention and respect for the university's research programs from around the world. The university continues to be a leader in stem cell research, helped in part by the funding of the Wisconsin Alumni Research Foundation and promotion of WiCell.

Its center for research on internal combustion engines, called the Engine Research Center, has a five-year collaboration agreement with General Motors. It has also been the recipient of multimillion-dollar funding from the federal government.

In June 2013, it is reported that the United States National Institutes of Health would fund an $18.13 million study at the University of Wisconsin. The study will research lethal qualities of viruses such as Ebola, West Nile and influenza. The goal of the study is to help find new drugs to fight off the most lethal pathogens.

In 2012, UW-Madison experiments on cats came under fire from People for the Ethical Treatment of Animals who claimed the animals were abused. In 2013, the NIH briefly suspended the research's funding pending an agency investigation. The following year the university was fined more than $35,000 for several violations of the Animal Welfare Act. Bill Maher, James Cromwell and others spoke out against the experiments that ended in 2014. The university defended the research and the care the animals received claiming that PETA's objections were merely a "stunt" by the organization.

Big Ten Academic Alliance 
The University of Wisconsin is a participant in the Big Ten Academic Alliance. The Big Ten Academic Alliance (BTAA) is the academic consortium of the universities in the Big Ten Conference. Students at participating schools are allowed "in-house" borrowing privileges at other schools' libraries. The BTAA uses collective purchasing and licensing, and has saved member institutions $19 million to date. Course sharing, professional development programs, study abroad and international collaborations, and other initiatives are also part of the BTAA.

College of Agricultural and Life Sciences

The College of Agricultural and Life Sciences fulfills the UW–Madison's mission as a land-grant university, which dates back to 1862, when Congress passed legislation to establish a national network of colleges devoted to agriculture and mechanics and Wisconsin received 240,000 acres of allotted federal land. 

In 1885 the university began offering a winter course for farmers, the Agriculture Short Course, which was greatly developed and enhanced by Ransom Asa Moore from 1895 until 1907 and continues today as the Farm and Industry Short Course. In 1889 the university put all of their agricultural offerings under a new College of Agriculture, with W.A. Henry as dean. Professors listed in the 1896 Agricultural Short Course for the College of Agriculture at the University of Wisconsin–Madison listed popular professors such the Dean of the College of Agriculture, W.A. Henry (Feeds and Feeding), S.M. Babcock (Agricultural Chemistry; Farm Dairying), F.H. King (Agricultural Physics, Agricultural Mechanics, and Meteorology), E.S. Goff (Plant Life, Horticulture, and Economic Entomology), H.L. Russell (Bacteriology), J.A. Craig (Breeds: Breeding and Judging Live Stock), Wm. A. Scott (Economics of Agriculture), C.I. King (Practical Mechanics), Mr. R.A. Moore (Parliamentary Procedures and Book-keeping), A.B. Sayles (Farm Dairying), Fred. Cranefield (Assistant in Green House Instruction), and the previous instructor in Veterinary Science, W.G. Clark, V.S.

The building that housed the College of Agriculture was originally created in 1889 and was centered in South Hall on Bascom Hill until the fall of 1903 when the first classes were held in the brand new College of Agriculture and Life Sciences building, where it has since remained. "The college has evolved and grown over the decades to reflect changes in the fabric of society and in the areas of knowledge that it studies. Practical studies related to crop and livestock production and farm life gradually delved deeper as scientists strove to understand the underlying biological processes. Today the college generates new knowledge about agriculture, natural resources management and protection, human health and nutrition, community development and related topics. Faculty and staff in 19 academic departments and a number of interdisciplinary programs carry out these lines of study."

It has 12 associated research centers including the Marshfield Agricultural Research Station and research centers in Arlington among other locations in Wisconsin.

Letters & Science Honors Program

The L&S Honors Program serves over 1300 students in the College of Letters and Science (the UW–Madison's liberal arts college) with an enriched undergraduate curriculum. In addition to its curriculum, the program offers professional advising services; research opportunities and funding; and numerous academic, social and service opportunities through the Honors Student Organization. The Honors Program also supports several student organizations, such as the University of Wisconsin–Madison Forensics Team.

WISCIENCE 
The Wisconsin Institute for Science Education and Community Engagement (WISCIENCE) is a unit that facilitates coordination of science outreach efforts across the university and works to improve science education at all levels.

Wisconsin Institute for Creative Writing 
The Wisconsin Institute for Creative Writing is a post-graduate program for emerging writers offered by the Creative Writing Program at the University of Wisconsin–Madison. Each year, it awards "internationally-competitive" nine-month fellowships to writers of fiction and poetry who have yet to publish a second book. Notable past Fellows include Anthony Doerr, Ann Packer and Quan Barry.

The Wisconsin Institute for Creative Writing offers two fellowships in fiction and three fellowships in poetry. These include the James C. McCreight Fiction Fellowship, the Carol Houck Smith Fiction Fellowship, the Ruth Halls Poetry Fellowship, the Ronald Wallace Poetry Fellowship, and the First Wave Poetry Fellowship. Additionally, it offers the Halls Emerging Artist Fellowship to a second-year candidate of the University of Wisconsin–Madison's MFA program in creative writing, in order to fund a third year of study. Fellows receive a cash prize of a minimum of $38,000 as well as health insurance. Fellows are required to live in the Madison, Wisconsin area for the duration of their fellowships, teach one creative writing workshop each semester, assist in judging the English department's writing contests and fellowships, and give a public reading.

The Wisconsin Institute for Creative Writing was founded in 1985 by the poet Ronald Wallace, who taught at the University of Wisconsin's English department from 1972 to 2015. WICW was created "to provide time, space, and an intellectual community for writers working on a first book of poetry or fiction." In 2012, the Institute expanded its fellowship eligibility requirements to include writers who have published only one book-length work of creative writing. From 2008 to 2014, it offered the Carl Djerassi Distinguished Playwriting Fellowship in addition to fiction and poetry fellowships.

Fellowship applications are judged anonymously until finalists are chosen. However, "it is the work and the work alone that really matters," says Jesse Lee Kercheval, in a conversation with the Association of Writers and Writing Programs.

Campus

Located in Madison, about a mile from the state capitol, the main campus of the university is situated partially on the isthmus between Lake Mendota and Lake Monona. The central campus is on an urban layout mostly coinciding with the city of Madison's street grid, exceptions being the suburban University of Wisconsin Hospital and Clinics, and the Department of Psychiatry & Clinics in the West Side research park. The University of Wisconsin–Madison Arboretum, a demonstration area for native ecosystems, is located on the west side of Madison. The main campus includes many buildings designed or supervised by architects J.T.W. Jennings and Arthur Peabody. The hub of campus life is the Memorial Union. UW–Madison's campus has been ranked as one of the most beautiful college campuses in the United States by Travel + Leisure and Condé Nast Traveler. One unusual feature of the campus is the Babcock Hall dairy plant and store, a fully functional dairy well known for its ice cream.

Bascom Hill 

As one of the icons on campus, Bascom Hall, at the top of Bascom Hill, is often considered the "heart of the campus." Built in 1857, a decorative dome that once sat atop the structure was destroyed by fire in 1916. The structure has been added to several times over the years. The building currently houses the office of the chancellor and vice chancellors. Bascom Hall is listed on the National Register of Historic Places as a contributing building within the Bascom Hill Historic District.

Music Hall, initially named Assembly Hall, was built in 1878 in a Gothic Revival style. It was designed to house an 800-seat auditorium, a library, and a clock tower. Dedicated on March 2, 1880, the building originally held conventions, dances, and commencement ceremonies, along with its primary purpose of a library. After the library moved to a different building on campus, a portion of the hall was assigned to the School of Music in 1900. Shortly after renovations in the early 1900s, the building was officially named Music Hall in 1910. It remains an important music venue and is home to the university opera. This building also is home to the Department of Urban and Regional Planning, with part of the building being used as office space and classrooms.

The Carillon Tower, erected in 1936, was designed by Warren Laird and Paul Cret so that the balustrade echoes that on Bascom Hall. The carillon has 56 bronze bells, with the largest weighing 6,800 pounds. An automated system rings bells on the hour, playing songs such as “Varsity” and “On, Wisconsin!”. East of the tower, lies a monument to the Sauk leader Black Hawk, whose flight through the Madison area represented the last armed conflict between the United States Army and native peoples in southern Wisconsin.

The George L. Mosse Humanities Building, located on Library Mall, was built in the late 1960s in the Brutalist style. Although debunked, the campus myth is that the building (with its poor ventilation, narrow windows, inclined base, and cantilevered upper floors) was designed to be "riot-proof". Its seven floors house the history, art, and music departments. The most recent campus master plan calls for it to be demolished and replaced with two other buildings, in part because of water damage.

Van Hise Hall is home to most of the languages departments of the university and the upper floors house the offices of the University of Wisconsin System's president and its Board of Regents. At 241 feet and 19 stories, Van Hise is the second-tallest building in Madison and one of the tallest educational buildings in the world. Because of its placement atop Bascom Hill it towers over the State Capitol as the building with the highest elevation in the city. Van Hise Hall was constructed in 1967 and its destruction is slated for sometime around 2025 as part of the university's campus master plan.

Wisconsin School of Business 

Home of the Wisconsin School of Business, Grainger Hall was built in 1993. In 2008, it underwent a major renovation and addition to assist the 12 MBA specialization programs that were housed there. The addition occupies the corner of Park Street and University Avenue, projecting the school's crest outward in a location that once housed a bank. Grainger Hall occupies an entire city block. 

Grainger Hall also houses an array of student-run organizations, both undergraduate and graduate. There are major-specific organizations as well as organizations that welcome all students. Several of the clubs are Madison chapters of nationwide organizations, others are honor societies that require a minimum grade point average, while some exist simply to network with other students.

The Wisconsin Union

The University of Wisconsin–Madison has two student unions. The older, Memorial Union, was built in 1928 to honor American World War I veterans. Also known as the Union or the Terrace, it has gained a reputation as one of the most beautiful student centers on a university campus. Located on the shore of Lake Mendota, it is a popular spot for socializing among both students and the public, who enjoy gazing at the lake and its sailboats. The union is known for the Rathskeller, a German pub adjacent to the lake terrace. Political debates and backgammon and sheepshead games over a beer on the terrace are common among students. The Rathskeller serves "Rathskeller Ale", a beer brewed expressly for the Terrace. Memorial Union was the first union at a public university to serve beer.

Memorial Union is home to many arts venues, including several art galleries, a movie theater, the Wisconsin Union Theater, and a craft shop that provides courses and facilities for arts and crafts activities. Students and Madison community members alike congregate at the Memorial Union for the films and concerts each week. An advisory referendum to renovate and expand Memorial Union was approved by the student body in 2006, and the university is currently undergoing the expansion.

Union South, the newer campus union, was built in 1971 to better accommodate a growing student enrollment and was demolished in 2008. A new "green" Union South, located on the site of the old union, opened April 15, 2011. It is a certified Leadership in Energy and Environmental Design (LEED) gold building. The building contains several dining options, an art gallery, a climbing wall, a bowling alley, event spaces, and a hotel.

The Wisconsin Union also provides a home for the Wisconsin Union Directorate Student Programming Board (WUD), which provides regular programs for both students and community members. One of the most well-known members of WUD is the Wisconsin Hoofers, a club that organizes outdoor recreational activities.

Libraries

The University of Wisconsin–Madison has the 12th largest research library collection in North America. More than 40 professional and special-purpose libraries serve the campus. The campus library collections include more than 8.3 million volumes representing human inquiry through all of history. In addition, the collections comprised more than 101,000 serial titles, 6.4 million microform items, and over 8.2 million items in other formats, such as government documents, maps, musical scores, and audiovisual materials. Over 1 million volumes are circulated to library users every year. Memorial Library serves as the principal research facility on campus for the humanities and social sciences. It is the largest library in the state, with over 3.5 million volumes. It also houses a periodical collection, domestic and foreign newspapers, Special Collections, the Mills Music Library, a letterpress printing museum, and the UW Digital Collections Center.

Steenbock Memorial Library is the primary library for the College of Agriculture and Life Sciences, School of Human Ecology, School of Veterinary Medicine, UW-Extension and Cooperative Extension, and Zoology and Botany Departments. The University of Wisconsin–Madison Archives and Records Management Department and Oral History Program are also located in Steenbock Library. The library is named for UW professor Harry Steenbock (1886–1967), who developed an inexpensive method of enriching foods with Vitamin D in the 1920s. This library is open to the public.

Undergraduates can find many of the resources they need at College Library in Helen C. White Hall. Special collections there include Ethnic Studies, Career, Women's, and Gaus (Poetry). The Open Book collection, created to support the extra-academic interests of undergraduates, contains DVDs, audio books, and video games, and paperback books. The library also has a coffee shop, the Open Book Café. College Library houses a media center with over 200 computer workstations, DV editing stations, scanners, poster printing, and equipment checkout (including laptops, digital cameras, projectors, and more).

The Kurt F. Wendt Library serves the College of Engineering and the Departments of Computer Sciences, Statistics, and Atmospheric & Oceanic Sciences. In addition to books, journals, and standards, Wendt Library houses over 1.5 million technical reports in print and microfiche. Designated a Patent and Trademark Depository Library, it maintains all U.S. utility, design, and plant patents, and provides reference tools and assistance for both the general public and the UW–Madison community.

Ebling Library for the Health Sciences is located in the Health Sciences Learning Center. It opened in 2004 after the Middleton Library, Weston Library, and Power Pharmaceutical Library merged collections and staff.

The LGBT Student Center, located in the Red Gym, functions as a library for queer-themed fiction and non-fiction and provides training and resources for the entire campus.

The Kohler Art Library is located in the Conrad A. Elvehjem Building across from the Chazen Museum of Art and serves as the main campus resource for art and architecture. The library supports the Departments of Art and Art History as well as the Chazen Museum. Its collections number over 185,000 volumes covering global art movements of all periods. A feature of the library is the Artists' Book Collection, which contains over 1,000 artists' books from 175 presses and artists. The collection, created as a teaching resource in 1970 by founding Kohler Art Library Director William C. Bunce, was digitized in 2007 by the UW Digital Collections Center. The Kohler Art Library is open to the public.

The online catalog for UW–Madison Libraries is MadCat. It includes bibliographic records for books, periodicals, audiovisual materials, maps, music scores, microforms, and computer databases owned by over 40 campus libraries, as well as records for items that are on order. The UW–Madison Libraries website provides access to resources licensed for use by those affiliated with UW–Madison, in addition to those openly available on the World Wide Web.

Museums

The Geology Museum features rocks, minerals, and fossils from around the world. Highlights include a blacklight room, a walk-through cave, and a fragment of the Barringer meteorite. Some noteworthy fossils include the first dinosaur skeleton assembled in Wisconsin (an Edmontosaurus), a shark (Squalicorax) and a floating colony of sea lilies (Uintacrinus), both from the Cretaceous chalk of Kansas, and the Boaz Mastodon, a found on a farm in southwestern Wisconsin in 1897.

The Chazen Museum of Art, formerly the Elvehjem Museum of Art, maintains a collection of paintings, drawings, sculpture, prints and photographs spanning over 700 years of art.

The university's Zoological Museum maintains a collection of approximately 500,000 zoological specimens, which can be used for research and instruction. A special collection contains skeletons, artifacts, and research papers associated with the Galápagos Islands. Since 1978, the UW–Madison Zoological Museum has been one of only three museums granted permission by the Ecuadoran Government to collect anatomical specimens from the Galápagos Islands.

The L. R. Ingersoll Physics Museum contains a range of exhibits demonstrating classical and modern physics. Many of the exhibits allow for hands-on interaction by visitors. The museum also has a number of historical instruments and pictures on display.

Effigy mounds

UW–Madison claims more distinct archaeological sites than on any other university campus.
The campus contains four clusters of effigy mounds located at Observatory Hill, Willow Drive, Picnic Point, and Eagle Heights. These sites, reflecting thousands of years of human habitation in the area, have survived to a greater or lesser degree on campus, depending on location and past building activities. Surviving sites are marked and fenced on the campus, ensuring that they are not disturbed. Wisconsin statutes protect effigy mounds by giving them a five-foot buffer zone. The Lakeshore Nature Preserve Committee is endeavoring to "…safeguard beloved cultural landscapes," through aggressive enforcement of measures for the preservation of such zones and advocating for broader buffers where possible.

Athletics

The University of Wisconsin–Madison sports teams participate in the NCAA's Division I-A. With the exception of lightweight Wisconsin Badgers Crew, the university's athletic programs compete in the Big Ten Conference. The women's hockey program competes in the Western Collegiate Hockey Association (WCHA), while the men's and women's crew programs compete in the Eastern Association of Rowing Colleges and Eastern Association of Women's Rowing Colleges, respectively. The school's fight song is On, Wisconsin!. The school's mascot is Buckingham U. Badger, commonly referred to as "Bucky Badger". The athletic director is Chris McIntosh.

2005–2006 marked the first time in school history that four Badger teams won national championships in the same academic year. In the fall, the men's cross country team won its fourth national championship. The winter season was highlighted by the men's and women's ice hockey teams both winning national titles. The year was capped off in the spring with the women's lightweight crew taking its third straight Intercollegiate Rowing Association national crown. In 2008, both men's and women's crew teams claimed national titles.

Football

The Badgers play college football at Camp Randall Stadium. The head coach is Luke Fickell. Before the fourth quarter of every game at Camp Randall, the crowd jumps around to House of Pain's song "Jump Around". After every game, the University of Wisconsin Marching Band plays popular songs during the Fifth Quarter. The Badgers won three Rose Bowl Championships under Barry Alvarez in 1994, 1999, and 2000. In 2006, Bret Bielema led the Badgers to a school record (at that time) 11-win regular season and to 12 overall wins, defeating Arkansas in the Capital One Bowl. Coach Paul Chryst would later break that record as he led the Badgers to 12 regular season wins in the 2017-2018 campaign, as well as a 34–24 victory over Miami in the Orange Bowl, for a season total of 13 wins. Chryst also won a Cotton Bowl the year before the Orange Bowl win.
The Badgers lost to TCU in the 2011 Rose Bowl Championship on January 1, 2011. In the 2011 season, the Badgers defended the B1G championship title to go to the 2012 Rose Bowl Championship. The Badgers lost to Oregon 45–38 in the highest-scoring Rose Bowl of all time. The Badgers made it to the 2013 Rose Bowl for their third consecutive Rose Bowl appearance. Bret Bielema took the Arkansas football head coaching position before the game and Barry Alvarez took over as a one-game interim coach. The Badgers lost to Stanford 14-20 for Barry Alvarez's first Rose Bowl loss, he had previously won it three times.

Men's basketball

The Badgers have made 19 consecutive appearances (1999–2017) in the NCAA Tournament, having played in the National Championship game in 2015, making Final Four visits in 2000 and 2014, an Elite Eight appearance in 2005, and Sweet Sixteen appearances in 2003, 2008, 2011, 2012, 2016, and 2017. Bo Ryan was the head coach from 2001 to 2015. Greg Gard is the current head coach.  The Badgers play at the Kohl Center, where the student fans are known as AreaRED. In the 2006–2007 season, the Badgers attained their highest AP ranking in school history (#1 Feb. 19–25), garnering 35 first-place votes. The Badgers earned their only NCAA National Championship in 1941.

Women's basketball

Women's ice hockey

Ice hockey

Badger ice hockey first became a men's varsity sport in 1922. Although dropped after the 1934–35 season, it again became a varsity sport in the 1963–64 season. The men's team played in the Dane County Coliseum until moving to the Kohl Center (capacity 15,359) in the fall of 1998. The first ice hockey game played at the Kohl was the Hall of Fame game against the University of Notre Dame. From 1999 to 2012 the men's team led the nation in college hockey attendance, setting an NCAA attendance record (averaging 15,048) during the 2009–10 season, which surpassed their previous record set in 2006–07.

Bob Johnson, nicknamed "Badger Bob" by fans, took over the reins in 1966. Johnson coached the Badger men to three national championships in 1973, 1977 and 1981. Jeff Sauer coached the Badger men to two more titles in 1983 and 1990. Mike Eaves, member of the 1977 NCAA title team, coached the Badger men's team to its sixth national championship in 2006. The six Badger titles rank fourth in NCAA men's ice hockey history. Eaves' 2010 squad advanced to the national championship game during the Badgers' 11th appearance in the men's Frozen Four before bowing to Boston College.

The school's strong ice hockey tradition gained another dimension with the addition of a women's team that began play in the 1999–2000 season. Coached by Mark Johnson, son of "Badger Bob" and another member of the men's 1977 title team, the Badger women won their first NCAA championship on March 26, 2006. The dual 2006 titles marked the first time that both the men's and women's Division I NCAA hockey titles were won by the same school in the same year. The women's team repeated as national champions in 2007 with a victory over the University of Minnesota-Duluth and in 2009 with a victory over Mercyhurst. The team set the NCAA women's hockey attendance record on February 15, 2014, in a game against Minnesota.

Rivalries

The Wisconsin Badgers' most notable rivalry within the Big Ten is with the University of Minnesota, which is the most-played rivalry in Division I-A football. In their annual college football game, the teams compete for Paul Bunyan's Axe. The two universities also compete in the Border Battle, a year-long athletic competition in which each team's wins earn points for their university.

Men's basketball rivalries include Michigan State, Illinois and non-conference, in-state Marquette.

The Wisconsin–Madison men's and women's hockey teams' most recognized rivals are the Golden Gophers of the University of Minnesota and the Fighting Hawks of the University of North Dakota. Other rivals include the University of Denver, Colorado College, Michigan Tech, University of Minnesota Duluth, and St. Cloud State.

Mascot

The school mascot is an anthropomorphized badger named Bucky who dons a sweater affixed with the UW–Madison athletic logo (currently the red "Motion W"). Beginning in 1890, the university's first Bucky Badger was a live, temperamental and unruly badger who was quickly retired. Although the nickname of the Wisconsin teams remained the "Badgers", it was not until Art Evans drew the early caricature version of Bucky in 1940 that today's recognizable image of Bucky was adopted. In 1949, a contest was held to name the mascot, but no consensus was reached after only a few entries were received. In reaction, the contest committee chose the name Buckingham U. Badger, or "Bucky", for short.

At Wisconsin football games in the 1920s live mascots were used to inspire fans. The animals used included a black bear, a bonnet monkey, and live badgers. 1949 was the first year a student sporting a papier-mâché badger head appeared; this subsequently replaced the use of live badgers.

The team's nickname originates from the state nickname. In the 1820s, many lead miners and their families lived in the mines in which they worked until adequate above-ground shelters were built, and thus were compared to badgers.

In 2009, Fulton Market Films produced the documentary Being Bucky which followed the lives of seven Wisconsin students who take on the role of Bucky Badger. Being Bucky won "Best Documentary Film" at the Wisconsin Film Festival and went on to play in local Wisconsin movie theaters.

Student life

Residential life 
The university runs over twenty residence halls, including learning communities and affinity communities. These are spread across two distinct neighborhoods: Lakeshore and Southeast. The largest residence hall has a capacity of 1,250 students, while the smallest is home to 30 residents. Nestled against Lake Mendota, the Lakeshore Neighborhood is home to thirteen residence halls and four dining markets. The neighborhood is close to Ebling and Steenbock Libraries and the Engineering campus. The Southeast Neighborhood, near downtown Madison, is home to eight residence halls and two dining markets. The Lakeshore and Southeast neighborhoods are considered to be rivals owing to their contrasting lifestyles. Southeast dorms are considered to be more social, while Lakeshore dorms tend to be more quiet. In winter, the two sides meet at Bascom Hill for a snowball fight that draws hundreds of students known as the "Battle for Bascom."

Chadbourne Residence Hall was constructed in 1959, with major renovations ranging from 2007 to 2010. The residence hall also houses the Chadbourne Residential College, a building-wide living-learning community. Chadbourne Residence Hall is connected to Rheta’s Market, a buffet-style dining hall.

On May 22, 2012, the Ho-Chunk Nation of Wisconsin passed a resolution permitting the usage of the name "Dejope," a variation of the original Ho-chunk term, for a new residence hall at the university. Teejop means "Four Lakes" in the Ho-Chunk language, and Native Americans have used this word to describe the Madison area for thousands of years. The residence hall was planned as a symbol of the ongoing cooperative relationship between University of Wisconsin–Madison and the Ho-Chunk nation and the building and its grounds contain imagery of the mounds and lakes in the area.

Media

Student publications
UW–Madison is the only university in the country with two daily student newspapers: The Daily Cardinal, founded in 1892 and The Badger Herald, founded in 1969. The Onion was founded in 1988 by two UW–Madison juniors, and was published in Madison before moving to New York City in 2001. It is also the home of The Madison Misnomer, an undergraduate comedy newspaper, founded in 2007.

UW–Madison is also home to one of only two nationally distributed undergraduate international studies journals in the country. The Journal of Undergraduate International Studies (JUIS) is a competitive publication that features peer-reviewed academic articles. It was founded in 2003 by David Coddon with the support of the University of Wisconsin–Madison Leadership Trust.

Campus radio
The University of Wisconsin–Madison campus radio station is WSUM 91.7 FM, "The Snake on the Lake". Historically, UW–Madison has been home to a collection of student run radio stations, a number of which stopped broadcasting after run-ins with the United States Federal Communications Commission (FCC). The current radio station, WSUM, began in 1997 in a webcast only format because of the prolonged battle to get an FCC license and construct a tower. This lasted five years until February 22, 2002, when the station started broadcasting over FM airwaves at 91.7 from its tower in Montrose, Wisconsin. The radio station currently has around 200 volunteer DJs and eight paid managers. All UW–Madison students, as well as a limited number of community members, are eligible to participate in running the station. WSUM remains entirely free format, which means that the on-air personnel can showcase a large variety of music and talk programming at their discretion with few limitations. WSUM has garnered many awards from the Wisconsin Broadcasters Association for their news, play-by-play broadcasts of Badger athletic events, and unique public service announcements.

Organizations

Over 800 student organizations or clubs registered with the Center for Leadership and Involvement (CFLI) at UW–Madison each year. 

Student organizations at the school include chapters of the fraternities Acacia, Alpha Chi Omega, Alpha Delta Phi, Alpha Gamma Rho Delta Chi and Sigma Alpha. Alpha Chi Sigma was founded at the university in 1902.

Religious student organizations include affiliates of the Christian organizations Athletes in Action, Chi Alpha Campus Ministries and the Christian Legal Society. Pres House is a progressive student organization loosely associated with the PCUSA that welcomes students of all backgrounds to its worship and various other gatherings. Wisconsin Lutheran Chapel is a Christian chapel and campus ministry that serves students of UW–Madison.

UW is also home to student vehicles teams such as Formula SAE combustion and electric, Baja SAE, SAE Clean Snow, ASME Human Powered Vehicle, Wisconsin Autonomous, Concrete Canoe and formerly the UW Hybrid Vehicle Team and Badgerloop.

There are 8 A cappella groups on the UW-Madison campus. Of them, two are mixed-voice, two are lower voice, two are upper voice, and two are themed mixed-voice. The groups are the MadHatters, Redefined A Cappella, Fundamentally Sound, Pitches and Notes, Tangled up in Blue, Under A-Rest, Jewop, and Wisconsin Waale.

MTV's College Life
On April 13, 2009, MTV premiered the reality series College Life about the day-to-day lives of eight UW–Madison freshmen. The show was created by UW–Madison alumnus David Wexler. According to MTV, the students did the filming for the series, but not the editing. During production, the university pulled its support of the show. Subsequently, a disclaimer was aired at the beginning of each episode stating that UW–Madison does not endorse the program. Eight episodes had aired . Signal and location blockers have been added for student safety .

Notable alumni and people 

As of October 2018, 26 Nobel laureates and 2 Fields medalists have been associated with UW–Madison as alumni, faculty, or researchers. Additionally, as of November 2018, the current CEOs of 14 Fortune 500 companies have attended UW–Madison, the most of any university in the United States. Notable CEOs who have attended UW-Madison include Thomas J. Falk (Kimberly-Clark), Carol Bartz (Yahoo!), David J. Lesar (Halliburton), Keith Nosbusch (Rockwell Automation), Lee Raymond (Exxon Mobil), Tom Kingsbury (Burlington Stores), and Judith Faulkner (Epic Systems).

, UW–Madison had more than 427,000 living alumni. Although a large number of alumni live in Wisconsin, a significant number live in Illinois, Minnesota, New York, California, and Washington, D.C.

UW–Madison alumni, faculty, or former faculty have been awarded 26 Nobel Prizes and 38 Pulitzer Prizes.

See also 
 Badgerloop - a SpaceX Hyperloop Competition Team
 MadFiber Ice Cream - created by the College of Agriculture and Life Sciences
 UW Hybrid Vehicle Team
 Weinert Center for Entrepreneurship
 World Cocoa Foundation (Partnership)

Notes

References

Further reading
 Butterfield, C. W.. History of the University of Wisconsin. Madison: University Press, 1879.
 Fred, Edwin Broun. A University Remembers. Madison: University of Wisconsin, 1969.
 
 Thwaites, Reuben Gold. History of the University of Wisconsin. 1900.

External links

 
 University of Wisconsin–Madison Athletics website
 
 
 
 
 

 
Buildings and structures in Madison, Wisconsin
Education in Madison, Wisconsin
Educational institutions established in 1848
Flagship universities in the United States
Forestry education
Land-grant universities and colleges
Madison
Tourist attractions in Madison, Wisconsin
University
National Register of Historic Places in Madison, Wisconsin
University of Wisconsin-Madison
Glassmaking schools